Khvostof Island or Atanak is an island in the Rat Islands archipelago of the Western Aleutian Islands, Alaska.

References

Rat Islands
Islands of Alaska
Islands of Unorganized Borough, Alaska